Christopher Shaw (30 July 1924 – 27 September 1995) was a British composer.

Shaw was born and lived in London, and studied at New College, Oxford, from 1942 through 1944 with R. O. Morris and Herbert Kennedy Andrews. He wrote principally choral music, of which the most notable example may be the cantata Peter and the Lame Man for soli, chorus and orchestra, recorded in 1976 by Argo Records along with three shorter pieces. He also wrote some music criticism and translated opera librettos.  He died at Gatehouse of Fleet, Galloway, Scotland, aged 71.

References

Further reading
 'Christopher Shaw' by David Drew, in Musical Times, July 1963 (the issue included Shaw's motet for voices and organ, A Lesson from Ecclesiastes, as a musical supplement)
 'A Note on Christopher Shaw' by Malcolm MacDonald in Lewis Foreman, ed. British Music Now: A Guide to the Work of Younger Composers (London: Paul Elek, 1975).

External links
http://www.singscript.plus.com/daviddrewmusic/shaw.htm

1924 births
1995 deaths
20th-century classical musicians
20th-century British composers
Alumni of New College, Oxford